The Human Development Index (HDI) is a composite statistic used to rank some area by level of "human development" and separate developed (Very High development), developing (High and Medium development), and underdeveloped (Low development) areas. The statistics is composed from data on life expectancy, education and per-capita GNI (as an indicator of standard of living) collected at the national level.

Administrative units by Human Development Index (international HDI) 
This is a list of administrative units of Pakistan by Human Development Index as of 2021.

Historical Trends by UNDP reports (international HDI) 
Human Development Index (by UN Method) of Pakistan's Administrative Units from 1990 - 2019.

Year reached Medium human development by Administrative unit

See also 
 Education in Pakistan
 Demographics of Pakistan
 Economy of Pakistan
 Health in Pakistan
 List of Pakistani provinces by gross domestic product

References

External links 
 UN Development Programme Human Development Reports

Pakistan
Pakistan
Administrative units of Pakistan by Human Development Index
Pakistan, HDI
Human Development Index